Timothy Randall (born 19 June 1986) is a Canadian bobsledder.

In 2012, Randall was part of the Canada 2 team that won a bronze medal at the World Cup event in Whistler.

References

1986 births
Living people
Bobsledders at the 2014 Winter Olympics
Canadian male bobsledders
Olympic bobsledders of Canada
Sportspeople from Calgary
Sportspeople from Hamilton, Ontario